Steven Butler is an American comic book artist.  He is known both for penciling the Archie Comics series Sonic the Hedgehog as well as creating new designs for Archie characters in 2007.

Career
Butler's work ranges from inking and providing occasional cover duties for Cat and Mouse to superhero illustrations in the original Silver Storm mini-series to publications such as Marvel Comics' Web of Spider-Man and Silver Sable.  The independent comic The Badger by First Comics served to launch his career, but his work at Silverline comics preceded Badger.

Butler has also been involved in several Christian comics projects. From 1999 to 2007 Butler worked on the PowerMark comic series from Powermark Productions. In 1999 he also illustrated 3 tracts for wrestler George South entitled The Greatest Match Ever, Who is Your Tag-Team Partner?, and Who Are You Wrestling Against?, packaged by The Nate Butler Studio and published by PowerMark Productions. In 2005 he pencilled the Welcome to Holsom series published by Radiant Life (Gospel Publishing House).

In 2007, Butler redesigned the Archie Comics characters to be more realistic.  These designs did not replace the better-known cartoony Dan DeCarlo/Bob Montana look, but are being used alongside the traditional designs for special projects.  The first story to use the designs was "Bad Boy Trouble," which Butler also drew, and the second was "The Matchmakers," which was drawn by Joe Staton. These publications are unrelated to the "New Riverdale" Archie reboot of 2015.

In 2021 Butler contributed the Jim Aparo inspired cover to Issue #1 of Austin Hough's The Masters from Power Comics, Inc..   Based on DC Comics Batman Limited Collectors' Edition C-37Butler replaced the Batman with the Black Owl (redesigned by Alan Weiss for Power Comics) along with replacing Joker, Catwoman, Penguin, and Two-Face with Power Comics original villains The Clerk, Sir Réal Ordéal, Graffiti, Panorama, and Monsieur Petit Renard.  His good friend Mort Todd contributed the colors.

Bibliography

The Masters #1 Cover "A" Power Comics, Inc. 2021
Sonic the Hedgehog
 Web of Spider-Man #117 (first story), 118-120, 122-125, 127-129.
 Spider-Man Unlimited (Vol. 1) #12 (some pages)

Notes

References

External links

 

Living people
Year of birth missing (living people)
Place of birth missing (living people)
American comics artists